Happy Clapper (foaled 25 October 2010) is a retired multiple Group 1 winning Australian bred thoroughbred racehorse.

He is also remembered for running second on 5 occasions behind champion race mare Winx.

Racing career
Happy Clapper raced as a 2 year old and 3 year old without success.  The horse won his first race as a 4 year old at Sydney’s Canterbury Park Racecourse when ridden by jockey Blake Shinn.

As a 5 year old he won his first stakes race when successful in the Group 2 Villiers Stakes.  After the race trainer, Pat Webster stated “I've had some good horses, but I’d have to say this is the best horse I’ve had”.

Happy Clapper finally tasted success as a 7 year old  in a Group 1 race when successful in the Epsom Handicap at Randwick Racecourse.  Trainer Pat Webster said after the race, “This is my greatest moment in racing”.

Later that season he was successful in another two Group 1 races, the Doncaster Handicap and the Canterbury Stakes.

After finishing seventh in the 2020 Queen Elizabeth Stakes, Happy Clapper was retired from racing and sent to ex-jockey Mal Fitzgerald who operates a facility for Racing NSW, retraining retired racehorses at Oxley Island near Taree.

References 
 

2010 racehorse births
Racehorses bred in Australia
Racehorses trained in Australia
Thoroughbred family 15-a